Thomas Helsby (4 April 1904 – 29 August 1961) was an English professional footballer who played as a right half.

Career
Born in Runcorn, Helsby played football for Rhyl Athletic, Wigan Borough, Ellesmere Port Town, Northwich Victoria, Runcorn, Cardiff City, Bradford City, Swindon Town, Hull City and Newport County.

Helsby joined First Division side Cardiff City in April 1928 but initially struggled to break into the first team. When the club were relegated to the Second Division, he enjoyed a prolonged spell in the side before leaving in 1931. He signed for Bradford City in March of that year, leaving the club in June 1933 to sign for Swindon Town. During his time with Bradford City he made 34 appearances in the Football League, as well as one FA Cup appearance.

Sources

References

1904 births
1961 deaths
English footballers
Rhyl F.C. players
Wigan Borough F.C. players
Ellesmere Port Town F.C. players
Northwich Victoria F.C. players
Runcorn F.C. Halton players
Cardiff City F.C. players
Bradford City A.F.C. players
Swindon Town F.C. players
Hull City A.F.C. players
Newport County A.F.C. players
English Football League players
Association football wing halves
Sportspeople from Runcorn